Philip Hammond, Baron Hammond of Runnymede (born 1955) is a British politician.

Philip Hammond may also refer to:

Philip Hammond (composer) (born 1951), Irish composer
Phil Hammond (born 1962), British doctor and comedian
Philip C. Hammond, archaeologist

See also
Philip Hamond (1883–1953), British Army officer